Malcolm Gibbon (born 24 October 1950) is an English former footballer.

Career
Gibbon graduated through the Port Vale juniors to make his first team debut in a 2–0 defeat to Brentford at Griffin Park on 13 May, the last day of the 1966–67 season. He made four Fourth Division appearances the following season under Stanley Matthews's stewardship, but was released in October 1968 by new "Valiants" manager Gordon Lee. He moved on to Aston Villa, Eastwood, Congleton Town and Milton United.

Career statistics
Source:

References

1950 births
Living people
Sportspeople from North Shields
Footballers from Tyne and Wear
English footballers
Association football midfielders
Port Vale F.C. players
Aston Villa F.C. players
Eastwood Hanley F.C. players
Congleton Town F.C. players
English Football League players